Silcrete is an indurated (resists crumbling or powdering) soil duricrust formed when surface soil, sand, and gravel are cemented by dissolved silica. The formation of silcrete is similar to that of calcrete, formed by calcium carbonate, and ferricrete, formed by iron oxide. It is a hard and resistant material, and though different in origin and nature, appears similar to quartzite. As a duricrust, there is potential for preservation of root structures as trace fossils.

Silcrete is common in the arid regions of Australia and Africa often forming the resistant cap rock on features such as the breakaways of the Stuart Range of South Australia. Silcrete can be found at a lesser extent throughout the world especially England (e.g. Hertfordshire puddingstone), and France. In the Great Plains of the United States, polished silcrete cobbles are locally common on the surface and in river gravels east of the outcrops of the Ogallala Formation.

In Australia, silcrete was widely used by Aboriginal people for stone tool manufacture, and as such, it was a tradeable commodity, and silcrete tools can be found in areas that have no silcrete groundmass at all, similar to the European use of flint.

Tools made out of silcrete which has not been heat treated are difficult to make with flintknapping techniques. It is widely believed by stone tool experts that the technology to treat silcrete by burying under a hot fire was known 25,000 years ago in Europe. Heating changes the stone structure making it more easily flaked. This process may have been the first use of so-called pyrotechnology by early mankind.

In South Africa at Pinnacle Point researchers have determined that two types of silcrete tools were developed between 60,000 and 80,000 years ago and used the heat treatment technique. There is evidence to suggest the technique may have been known as early as 164,000 years ago.

The peoples of the African Middle Stone Age (MSA) showed a preference for silcrete tools, sourcing the material from up to 200 km to use in place of more accessible quartz and quartzite. MSA quarries have recently been found in Botswana south of the Okavango Delta. Evidence was found that raw silcrete blanks and blocks were transported prior to heat treating during the MSA. The geochemical signatures of the fragments can be used to identify where many of the individual pieces were quarried.

Gallery

References 

Soil